Cichorium pumilum is a Mediterranean species of plant in the tribe Cichorieae within the family Asteraceae . Like the two other species of Cichorium, its leaves are edible by humans. The plant produces bluish-violet flower heads and fleshy taproots.

References

External links
Wild Flowers of Israel
photo of herbarium specimen at Missouri Botanical Garden

Cichorieae
Plants described in 1771
Edible plants